Miguel Ángel Montes Busto (28 February 1940 – 20 May 2019) was a Spanish professional football player and manager.

Born in Oviedo, Asturias, Montes Busto played as a forward and spent twelve seasons in the Segunda División between 1959 and 1971. He played for Real Gijón, Las Palmas and Real Oviedo. After retiring from playing, he managed Segunda División side Palencia, several Segunda División B clubs and Sporting de Gijón in La Liga.

Montes Busto died on 20 May 2019 in Gijón, Asturias, at the age of 79.

References

External links

1940 births
2019 deaths
Association football forwards
La Liga managers
Real Oviedo players
Segunda División players
Spanish footballers
Sporting de Gijón players
Footballers from Oviedo
UD Las Palmas players
Spanish football managers
Segunda División managers
Segunda División B managers
Tercera División managers
UP Langreo managers
Real Avilés CF managers
Zamora CF managers
Palencia CF managers
Cultural Leonesa managers
Sporting de Gijón managers